Isaiah Pola-Mao (born June 30, 1999) is an American football safety for the Las Vegas Raiders of the National Football League (NFL).

Early life and education
Pola-Mao was born on June 30, 1999, in Phoenix, Arizona. He attended Mountain Pointe High School, where he played football, basketball, and track. As a sophomore in football, Pola-Mao was named first-team USA Today All-Arizona after recording 35 tackles and seven interceptions, two of which were returned for touchdowns. In his junior year, he again earned first-team All-Arizona honors, posting 98 tackles and four interceptions on defense while making 27 pass receptions on offense. As a senior, Pola-Mao was named a PrepStar All-American, Max Preps first-team All-America, USA Today All-Arizona and the All-East Valley Tribune Defensive Player of the Year after recording 100 tackles and 10 interceptions. He returned three picks for scores and registered 646 receiving yards on 28 catches, scoring nine touchdowns offensively.

In January 2017, Pola-Mao announced his commitment to USC. He redshirted as a freshman after having season-ending shoulder surgery in training camp. As a redshirt-freshman the following year, he started the first two games before re-injuring his shoulder, ending his season. He recorded eight tackles and a forced fumble in the games in which he appeared.

As a sophomore in 2019, Pola-Mao was the starting USC free safety, recording 73 tackles and a team-high four interceptions in 13 games played. He made interceptions in three consecutive games, becoming the first USC player in over 20 years to have this accomplishment. At the end of the year, Pola-Mao was named the USC co-Defensive Perimeter Player of the Year.

As a junior in 2020, Pola-Mao started at free safety and appeared in all six games during a COVID-19-shortened season. He was team captain and made 40 tackles, 2.5 for-loss, as well as a team-leading five passes defended, team-leading three fumbles recovered and one interception. He was named second-team All-Pac-12 Conference by Associated Press (AP) and a third-team choice by Pro Football Focus.

Pola-Mao announced his return for a final season in 2021. He started at free safety during the year, playing in 11 games, nine as a starter, and making 57 tackles, placing third on the team. He also made a pass deflection and recorded a fumble recovered. He was co-team captain during the season. Pola-Mao finished his college career with 178 tackles, five interceptions, eight passes defended, four fumbles recovered and one forced in 32 games played.

Professional career
After going unselected in the 2022 NFL Draft, Pola-Mao was signed by the Las Vegas Raiders as an undrafted free agent. He was one of four undrafted rookies to make the Raiders' final roster. He was waived on September 29, after appearing in two games. He was re-signed to the practice squad on October 1. The Raiders promoted him to the active roster on November 9.

Personal life
Pola-Mao is the nephew of Pro Football Hall of Famer Troy Polamalu.

References

External links
Las Vegas Raiders bio
USC Trojans bio

1999 births
Living people
Players of American football from Arizona
Sportspeople from Phoenix, Arizona
USC Trojans football players
American football safeties
Las Vegas Raiders players